The FIL European Luge Natural Track Championships 2006 took place in Umhausen, Austria.

Men's singles

Women's singles

Men's doubles

Medal table

References
Men's doubles natural track European champions
Men's singles natural track European champions
Women's singles natural track European champions

FIL European Luge Natural Track Championships
Sport in Tyrol (state)
Imst District
2006 in luge
2006 in Austrian sport
Luge in Austria
International sports competitions hosted by Austria